David Frederick Dolphin (born 13 May 1950) is a former international cricketer who represented the Zimbabwean national team between 1989 and 1990, including at the 1990 ICC Trophy. He played as a left-arm orthodox spin bowler.

Beginning in the early 1980s, Dolphin made regular appearances for the Zimbabwe Country Districts team, playing against teams like Kenya (in 1981), Pakistan International Airlines (1982), New South Wales (1986), West Indies B (1986), Sri Lanka B (1988), and England A (1990). In 1989, he also toured Ireland with a Mashonaland team. Dolphin made his debut for Zimbabwe B later in 1989, taking 5/112 against a Young West Indies team captained by Brian Lara. He dismissed Lara for just two runs. After that game, Dolphin was selected to make his first-class debut for the senior Zimbabwe team. He took four wickets across two four-day matches, including 3/59 in the second. After being included in Zimbabwe's squad for the 1990 ICC Trophy in the Netherlands, Dolphin played another two first-class matches on a warm-up tour of England (against Gloucestershire and Lancashire). However, he was selected for only a single match at the ICC Trophy, taking 0/15 from 12 overs against Singapore. He was 40 years old at the time (with John Traicos being the only older player in Zimbabwe's squad), and made no further international appearances.

References

External links

1950 births
Living people
Cricketers from Pietermaritzburg
South African cricketers
South African emigrants to Zimbabwe
Zimbabwean cricketers